Striatoguraleus vellicatus is a species of sea snail, a marine gastropod mollusk in the family Horaiclavidae.

Description
The length of this nassariiform shell attains 6.6 mm. It differs from S. Himaeformis in that it lacks a brephic sculptural stage, and instead develops directly from the protoconch to axial and spiral sculpture.

Distribution
This marine species occurs off Transkei, South Africa

References

 Kilburn, R. N. "Turridae (Mollusca: Gastropoda) of southern Africa and Mozambique. Part 7. Subfamily Crassispirinae, section 2." Annals of the Natal Museum 35.1 (1994): 177–228

External links
  Tucker, J.K. 2004 Catalog of recent and fossil turrids (Mollusca: Gastropoda). Zootaxa 682:1–1295.

Endemic fauna of South Africa
vellicatus
Gastropods described in 1994